Kiri Mangyal is a village 16 km from the Pathankot , Punjab, India.kiri has j&k border on North side. It  is surrounded by a lot many stone crushers.

Villages in Gurdaspur district